Sudan has 4,725 kilometers of narrow-gauge, single-track railways. The main line runs from Wadi Halfa on the Egyptian border to Khartoum and southwest to El-Obeid via Sannar and Kosti, Sudan, with extensions to Nyala in Southern Darfur and Wau in Western Bahr al Ghazal, South Sudan. Other lines connect Atbarah and Sannar with Port Sudan, and Sannar with Ad Damazin. A 1,400-kilometer line serves the al Gezira cotton-growing region. There are plans to rehabilitate rail transport to reverse decades of neglect and declining efficiency. Service on some lines may be interrupted during the rainy season.

Statistics
Total route length: 5,063 km
 gauge: 4,347 km 
 gauge plantation lines: 716 km 
Note: the main line linking Khartoum to Port Sudan carries over two-thirds of Sudan's rail traffic

Sudan Railways
The main system, Sudan Railways, which was operated by the government-owned Sudan Railways Corporation (SRC), provided services to most of the country's production and consumption centers.  The other line, the Gezira Light Railway, was owned by the Sudan Gezira Board and served the Gezira Scheme and its Manaqil Extension.  Rail dominated commercial transport in the early years but competition from the highways increased rapidly and by 2013, 90% of inland transport in Sudan was by road. The main rail system was reorganised into two companies - the SRC which owned the physical assets of the Sudan Railways and another company which organised the operations with participation of private companies (10 private companies were reported to be running operations in different lines in 2013).

History

The pre-eminence of the rail system is based on historical developments that led to its construction as an adjunct to military operations, although the first line, started in 1874 by the Khedive Isma'il Pasha, from Wadi Halfa to Sarras about 54 km upstream on the East bank of the Nile River, was originally a commercial undertaking.  The line did not prove to be commercially viable, and operations were stopped by the Governor-General Gordon in 1878 to reduce expenditure. In 1884, the line was extended to Akasha on the Nile by the Nile Expedition, but was destroyed by Dervishes when the Anglo-Egyptian troops withdrew to Wadi Halfa.

In 1884, during the Red Sea Expedition, John Aird & Co. constructed a  line from Suakin on the Red Sea inland to Otau, but it was abandoned in 1885. In May 1887, the Wadi Halfa - Saras line was extended again to Kerma, above the third cataract, to support the Anglo-Egyptian Dongola Expedition against the Mahdiyah.  The line, which was poorly constructed and of little other use, was abandoned in 1905.

The first segment of the present-day Sudan Railways, from Wadi Halfa to Abu Hamad on the Nile, was also a military undertaking.  It was built by the British in the late 1890s, for use in General Herbert Kitchener's drive against the Mahdiyah. During the campaign, the line was pushed to Atbarah on the Nile in 1897  and, after the defeat of the Mahdiyah in 1898, was continued to Khartoum, which it reached on the last day of 1899. The line was built in the  gauge, apparently the result of Kitchener's pragmatic use of the rolling stock and rails of that gauge from the old line. That gauge became the standard for all later Sudanese mainline construction.

The line opened a trade route from central Sudan through Egypt to the Mediterranean and beyond.  It became uneconomic because of the distance and the need for trans-shipment via the Nile and, in 1904, construction of a new line from Atbarah to the Red Sea was undertaken, with the line being completed in October 1905.  In 1906, the new line reached the recently built Port Sudan to provide a direct connection between Khartoum and ocean-going transport.

During the same decade, a line was also constructed from Khartoum southward to Sannar, the heart of the cotton-growing region of Al Jazirah. In February 1912, a westward continuation reached El-Obeid, then the country's second-largest city, and the center of gum arabic production.  In the north, a branch line was built from near Abu Hamad to Kuraymah that tied the navigable stretch of the Nile between the fourth and third cataracts into the transport system. Traffic in this case, however, was largely inbound to towns along the river, a situation that still prevailed in 1990.

In the 1920s, a spur of the railway was built from Hayya, a point on the main line 200 km southwest of Port Sudan, then extended south to the cotton-producing area near Kassala, the grain region of Al Qadarif and, finally, to a junction with the main line at Sennar. Much of the area's traffic, which formerly had passed through Khartoum, has since moved over that line directly to Port Sudan.

The final phase of railway construction began in the 1950s. It included extension of the western line to Nyala (1959) in Darfur Province, and a southwesterly branch to Wau (1961), southern Sudan's second largest city, located in the province of Bahr el Ghazal. That essentially completed the Sudan Railways network, which totalled about 4800 route km in 1990. There were small later extensions from Abu Gabra to El Muglad (52 km in 1995), El Obeid to the El Obeid refinery (10 km), and El Ban to the Merowe Dam (10 km.].

Source:

Diesel traction

Conversion of Sudan Railways to diesel traction started in the late 1950s, but a few mainline steam locomotives continued in use in 1990, serving lines having lighter weight rails.  Through the 1960s, rail essentially had a monopoly on transportation of export and import trade, and operations were profitable. In the early 1970s, losses were experienced, and, although the addition of new diesel equipment in 1976 was followed by a return to profitability, another downturn had occurred by the end of the decade. The losses were attributed in part to inflationary factors, the lack of spare parts, and the continuation of certain lines characterized by only light traffic, but retained for economic development needs and for social reasons. A number of South African diesel locomotives are in use in Sudan.

Downturn

The chief cause of the downturn appeared to have been loss of operational efficiency.  Worker productivity had declined. For example, repair of locomotives was so slow that only about half of the total number were usually operational.  Freight car turnaround time had lengthened considerably, and the reported slowness of management to meet growing competition from road transport was also a major factor.  A former official in the Sudan train union blamed Gaafar Nimeiry's attempts to crush the unions (who had organised numerous strikes on the railway) by firing 20,000 well qualified employees from 1975-1991. The road system, although generally more expensive, was used increasingly for low-volume, high-value goods because it could deliver more rapidly—2 or 3 days from Port Sudan to Khartoum, compared with 7 or 8 days for express rail freight and up to two weeks for ordinary freight.  In 1982,  only one to two percent of freight (and passenger) trains arrived on time.  The gradual erosion of freight traffic was evident in the drop from more than 3 million tons carried annually at the beginning of the 1970s to about 2 million tons at the end of the decade.  The 1980s also saw a steady erosion of tonnage as a result of a combination of inefficient management, union intransigence, the failure of agricultural projects to meet production goals, the dearth of spare parts, and the continuing civil war. The bridge at Aweil was destroyed in the 1980s and Wau was without rail access for over 20 years. The line to Wau was reopened in 2010 but Wau became part of South Sudan when it declared independence in 2011. During the civil war in the south (1983–2005) military trains went as far as Aweil accompanied by large numbers of troops and militia, causing great disruption to civilians and humanitarian aid organisations along the railway line.

Modernisation
Despite the rapidly growing use of roads, rail has remained of paramount importance because of its ability to move at lower cost the large volume of agricultural exports and to transport inland the increasing imports of heavy capital equipment and construction materials for development, such as requirements for oil exploration and drilling operations.  Efforts to improve the rail system reported in the late 1970s and the 1980s included laying heavier rails, repairing locomotives, purchasing new locomotives, modernizing signaling equipment, expanding training facilities, and improving locomotive and rolling-stock repair facilities.  One project would double-track the line from Port Sudan to the junction of the branch route to Sannar, thus in effect doubling the Port Sudan-Khartoum rail line.  Substantial assistance was furnished for these and other stock and track improvement projects by foreign governments and organizations, including the European Development Fund, the AFESD, the International Development Association, Britain, France, China and Japan.  Implementation of much of this work was hampered by political instability in the 1980s, debt, the dearth of hard currency, the shortage of spare parts, and import controls. A former rail union official also blamed the Sudanese president Omer Hassan al-Bashir who took office in 1989 and continued the previous regime's policy of mass firing, forcing into early retirement or transferring to out of the way locations of qualified railroad employees and replacing them with incompetent political appointees. Rail was estimated in mid-1989 to be operating at less than 20% of capacity. In 2015 the railways were said to have 60 trains available but the maximum speed they could travel was 40 km/h due to poor railway tracks.

In 2015 the Sudanese president Omar Hassan al-Bashir promised to modernise and upgrade the Sudanese railways with Chinese funds and technical assistance after years of maladministration and neglect. However a 2016 article noted that many Chinese firms had given up dealing with Sudan because of sanctions and pressure from the US.

In 2021 the government put forward a $640m programme to rehabilitate its rail system. African Development Bank has offered a $75m grant towards the cost while China State Construction Engineering and several Gulf firms are reported to be interested in becoming involved with the project. The first phase of the project will be to carry out $17m of emergency repairs to lines that are in use. The second will be to renew abandoned lines, most of which are in the south of the country.

Gezira Light Railway
The Gezira Light Railway, one of the largest light railways in Africa, evolved from tracks laid in the 1920s' construction of the canals for the Gezira Scheme.  At the time, rail had about 135 route km of  narrow gauge track.  As the size of the project area increased, the railway was extended and by the mid-1960s consisted of a complex system totalling 716 route km. Its primary purpose has been to serve the farm area by carrying cotton to ginneries and fertilizers, fuel, food, and other supplies to the villages in the area. Operations usually have been suspended during the rainy season.

Tokar - Trinkitat Light Railway

The Tokar - Trinkitat Light Railway was built in 1921/1922 at  narrow gauge and was 29 km long, primarily used for the export of the cotton crop from Tokar. It used ex-War Department Light Railways rolling stock and Simplex locomotives. It was absorbed by Sudan Railways in 1933 and closed in 1952.

Proposed Nyala - Chad extension
In 2011 funds were reportedly obtained to construct an extension from Nyala to Chad - the financing was to be obtained from China. In 2012 a contract to build a rail line from the Sudan-Chad border to the capital of Chad, N'Djamena was also reported to be signed. But in 2014 it was reported that although Sudan and Chad had agreed to stop supporting rebels in each other's countries, the US$2 billion project had still not been signed nor started.

Proposed link to Ethiopia 
In June 2020 the funding was approved to finance a $3.4m feasibility study into a standard-gauge rail link between Ethiopia and Sudan. Ethiopia is considering a 1,522km line between Addis Ababa, Khartoum and Port Sudan on the Red Sea. The route has already been agreed by both governments. The two-year study will assess the railway’s technical, economic, environmental and social challenges, including the possibility of procuring it as a public–private partnership.

Link to Egypt 
A 250 km/h rail link from the Egyptian city of Aswan to Wadi Halfa in the north has been proposed. The $2.5 million feasibility study was signed with Kuwaiti investment in April 2022, and would include a 6km bridge across Lake Nasser. A further standard-gauge extension from Halfa to Khartoum has been proposed to give travelers from there a one-seat ride to Alexandria.

South Sudan independence 

After the Declaration of Independence of South Sudan in 2011, 248 km of the Babanousa-Wau line was no longer within (north) Sudanese territory.

Specifications 

 Gauge: 
 Brakes: Air instead of Vacuum
 Couplings: AAR couplers instead of ABC

Links to neighboring countries 
  Central African Republic - none
  Chad - planned - line to border from Nyala
  Egypt - planned  
  Eritrea -  Teseney, Eritrea - discontinued - break of gauge 1067mm/950mm
  Ethiopia - none - proposed standard gauge link 
  Libya - none
  South Sudan - via Babanosa to Wau line

See also

 Economy of Sudan
 Transport in Sudan
 Railway stations in Sudan
 Sinfin

References

Further reading

External links

 UN Map
 UNHCR Atlas Map
 Interactive map of Sudan and South Sudan railways
 Sudan Railways Corporation
  illustrated description of the Sudan railways